Koshkuiyeh District is a district (bakhsh) in Rafsanjan County, Kerman Province, Iran. At the 2006 census, its population was 22,048, in 5,303 families.  The district has one city: Koshkuiyeh. The district has three rural districts (dehestan): Koshkuiyeh Rural District, Raviz Rural District, and Sharifabad Rural District.

References 

Rafsanjan County

Districts of Kerman Province